The 1976–77 FIBA Women's European Champions Cup was the 19th edition of FIBA Europe's competition for women's basketball national champion clubs, running from October 1976 to March 1977. For the first time the final was played as a single match in a neutral venue, with Daugava Riga defeating Clermont UC in Barcelona to win its 16th title.

Preliminary round

First round

Group stage

Group A

Group B

Semifinals

Final

References

Champions Cup
EuroLeague Women seasons